During the 1937–38 English football season, Brentford competed in the Football League First Division. In the league, the Bees matched the previous season's finish of 6th and advanced to the 6th round of the FA Cup for the first time in club history. In 2013, the Brentford supporters voted 1937–38 as the club's second-best season.

Season summary

As in the past two off-seasons, Brentford manager Harry Curtis elected to bring in youngsters to supplement his squad, with left half Tally Sneddon and forwards George Eastham and Maurice Edelston being the only new outfield summer signings who would appear during the season. Two goalkeepers were signed to back up Jim Mathieson – Joe Crozier and Ted Gaskell.

Despite an opening-day defeat to Bolton Wanderers which left Brentford bottom of the First Division, the team rallied in mid-September 1937 and with forward David McCulloch in outstanding goalscoring form, the Bees went on a six-match undefeated run which took them from 13th to the top of the table on 16 October. With Bobby Reid and Billy Scott also supplementing McCulloch's goals up front, Brentford remained unmoved from the top of the table between 30 September 1937 and 19 February 1938, only dropping back to 3rd position after a second defeat in three matches. In the midst of the run, Brentford had advanced to the sixth round of the FA Cup for the first time in club history, exiting after a 3–0 defeat to Preston North End, which was played in front of a then-club record crowd of 37,586 at Griffin Park.

Brentford won just four of the final 16 matches of the season and finished in 6th place, matching the previous season's position. The Bees took part in the one-off Empire Exhibition Trophy after the season, replacing Arsenal (who had dropped out of the competition), but fell at the first hurdle after being defeated 1–0 by Heart of Midlothian at Ibrox. In 2013, the Brentford supporters voted 1937–38 as the club's second-best season.

League table

Results
Brentford's goal tally listed first.

Legend

Football League First Division

FA Cup

Empire Exhibition Trophy

 Sources: Statto, 11v11, 100 Years of Brentford, A-Z Of Bees, London Hearts

Playing squad 
Players' ages are as of the opening day of the 1937–38 season.

 Sources: 100 Years of Brentford, Timeless Bees, Football League Players' Records 1888 to 1939

Coaching staff

Statistics

Appearances and goals

Players listed in italics left the club mid-season.
Source: 100 Years of Brentford

Goalscorers 

Players listed in italics left the club mid-season.
Source: 100 Years of Brentford

International caps

Full

Amateur

Management

Summary

Transfers & loans 
Cricketers are not included in this list.

Notes

References 

Brentford F.C. seasons
Brentford